Nurlan Baiuzakuly Yermekbayev (Nūrlan Baiūzaqūly Ermekbaev) is a Kazakh politician, diplomat and Lieutenant General in the Ground Forces who had been the Minister of Defense of Kazakhstan from 7 August 2018 to 31 August 2021.

Biography
He was born on New Year's Day in 1963 in the city of Shymkent in the Kazakh SSR. He began his career at the Dmitri Mendeleev Chemical Technical College in Moscow, where he began his studies. In the spring of 1981, Yermekbayev was conscripted into the Soviet Armed Forces and enrolled in the army's military institute in the capital. From 1984 to 1985, he participated in combat mission of the USSR in the Republic of Angola. He graduated with honors from the Military Institute of the Ministry of Defense of the USSR in the late 1980's, specializing in knowledge of Chinese and English. After he graduated, he served until 1991 in the Armed Forces of the USSR in the Osh Region of the Kyrgyz SSR and in the city of Ust-Kamenogorsk of the Kazakh SSR. Following the collapse of the Soviet Union, Yermekbayev worked in foreign economic organizations and in trade missions at embassies of Kazakhstan.

In 2001, he served as an aide to Kuanysh Sultanov and Zhanybek Karibzhanov, who were the Ambassadors of Kazakhstan to China. Since he left that post in 2003, he served in various administrative posts at foreign policy institutions in Kazakhstan and abroad. Between 2007 and 2012, Yermekbayev worked in his position as Deputy Minister of Foreign Affairs of Kazakhstan and Assistant to the President of Kazakhstan. From April–October 2012, he was appointed to a series of ambassadorial posts in China, Vietnam, and North Korea. In 2013, during his role as Ambassador to China, he stated that "by 2050, Kazakhstan should become one of the 30 developed countries in the world". He was recalled in November 2014 to be appointed Secretary of the Security Council.

Minister for Religious Affairs and Civil Society
On 13 September 2016, he was made Minister for Religious Affairs and Civil Society of Kazakhstan, with the ministry being established the same day. His tenure was marked with the management of the trend of Islamic extremists in Kazakhstan and Central Asia. In May 2017, Yermekbayev said that despite his efforts, "no state enjoys absolute protection" against radicalism. This followed an attack the previous summer by Islamic militants at a National Guard facility in Aktobe, which resulted in the deaths of three people. He acknowledged that because of the attacks, he ordered a moderate terrorist alert be put in place and then deactivated after the situation was stabilized, which he said "did not require much time". In an op-ed in The Diplomat, he stated that the rooting out of Islamic extremism needs to be at the "top of the global agenda" and that it "must start with young people who have been deliberately targeted by the extremists".

Minister of Defence
On 4 April 2018, by the decree of the Nursultan Nazarbayev, he was dismissed from the post of Minister for Religious Affairs and Civil Society and was appointed Secretary of the Security Council once again. He was appointed as a Defense Minister on 7 August 2018 by Nazarbayev, succeeding Colonel General Saken Zhasuzakov.  Due to his prior experience in the Soviet Army, Yermekbayev was granted the rank of Major General by Nazarbayev on 18 March 2019, effectively returning him to military service and making him the first minister to have served in a civilian and military capacity in the same tenure. In August 2019, he presided over the events of the 5th International Army Games led by the Russian Ministry of Defence, in which "over 5,000 soldiers from 39 countries are taking part" according to Yermekbayev. When describing the deployment of the KAZBAT to Lebanon as part of United Nations Interim Force in Lebanon, he said it is "a matter of national importance" during working visit to the Iliyski Training Site in the Almaty Region. He later visited Beirut to meet with members of the battalion and the joint-Indian Army contingent. During this visit, he also held negotiations with National Defense Minister Elias Bou Saab.

On 6 May 2020, on the eve of the Defender of the Fatherland Day celebration, he was promoted to the rank of Lieutenant General.

Resignation
Following the explosion at the arms depot in Jambyl Region, allegedly caused by fire which resulted in injuries and deaths of several military personnel, Yermekbayev at a briefing on 27 August 2021 announced his intent to resign, adding that the final decision would be made by President Kassym-Jomart Tokayev. On 31 August, it became known that Yermekbayev's resignation was accepted, with him being succeeded by Murat Bektanov. During the meeting with Tokayev, Yermekbayev accepted the blame for the tragedy citing the lack of time in work being done at the combusted depot, apologising to the victims of which included their relatives and friends.

Private life

Yermekbayev is a polyglot, being fluent in English, Russian, Chinese, and Portuguese, apart from his native Kazakh. His hobbies include playing golf, visiting other countries, and reading. In August 2018, he was elected as President of the All-Kazakhstan Association of Hand-to-Hand Fight. He is a PhD candidate of political sciences, as well as an author of dozens of books, including co-author of the book Kazakhstan and the countries of the world.

Education 

 1986 — Military Institute of the Ministry of Defense of the USSR
 1996 — Kazakh Leading Academy of Architecture and Civil Engineering

Awards 
 Order of Parasat (2015)
 Order of Kurmet (2005)
 Medal "For Contribution to Foreign Intelligence"
 Jubilee Medal "70 Years of the Armed Forces of the USSR"
 Medal "20 Years of the Constitution of Kazakhstan"
 Medal "20 Years of the Armed Forces of the Republic of Kazakhstan"
 Medal "20 years of Military Intelligence"
 Medal "10 years of the Constitution of the Republic of Kazakhstan"
 Medal "20 years of the Assembly of the People of Kazakhstan"

See also 
Armed Forces of the Republic of Kazakhstan
Angola: unknown mission in Africa

References 

1963 births
Living people
Ministers of Defence of Kazakhstan
People from Shymkent
Government ministers of Kazakhstan
Recipients of the Order of Kurmet